New Madrid Township is an inactive township in New Madrid County, in the U.S. state of Missouri.

New Madrid Township takes its name from the community of New Madrid, Missouri.

References

Townships in Missouri
Townships in New Madrid County, Missouri